Madhukar Yashwantrao Kukde is a former member of Parliament. Since 2018–19, he represents the Bhandara-Gondiya Lok Sabha constituency in India, a seat he won as a member of the Nationalist Congress Party. He previously spent three terms (1995–2009) in the Maharashtra Legislative Assembly representing the  Tumsar constituency but as a member of the Bharatiya Janata Party.

References

Living people
Year of birth missing (living people)
Bharatiya Janata Party politicians from Maharashtra
Nationalist Congress Party politicians from Maharashtra
Members of the Maharashtra Legislative Assembly
Lok Sabha members from Maharashtra